Little Sugar Loaf is a  hill in the far northeastern sector of the Wicklow Mountains in Ireland. It does not have the elevation to rank on Arderin, Hewitt, or Vandeleur-Lynam scales, however, its prominence of  ranks it as a Marilyn.

The Little Sugar Loaf is situated northeastwards from the Great Sugar Loaf, but separated by the N11 dual carriageway. The northern side of Little Sugar Loaf directly overlooks the town of Bray; the eastern side (see photo) looks across the R761 between Bray and Greystones to the western slope of Bray Head.  Little Sugar Loaf has a distinctive profile of a rocky double summit.  Like the Great Sugar Loaf, it consists of Cambrian Period quartzite bedrock.

Irish academic Paul Tempan notes that the Irish name Giolspar is likely a translation of the English "gilt spur", based on a record of a 12th-century transaction by Diarmait Mac Murchada of land in the area which involved the payment of a pair of "gilt spurs" to him and his heirs on an annual basis.

Bibliography

See also

Wicklow Way
Wicklow Mountains
Lists of mountains in Ireland
List of mountains of the British Isles by height
List of Marilyns in the British Isles

References

External links
MountainViews: The Irish Mountain Website, Little Sugar Loaf
MountainViews: Irish Online Mountain Database
The Database of British and Irish Hills , the largest database of British Isles mountains ("DoBIH")
Hill Bagging UK & Ireland, the searchable interface for the DoBIH

Marilyns of Ireland
Mountains and hills of County Wicklow
Mountains under 1000 metres